Fairfield is a west Stockton area in the borough of Stockton-on-Tees, County Durham, England. It was originally the site of a field which hosted a fair, hence its name. It is home to several schools and a small library. South of the area, near Hartburn, is older than the northern part of the area, near Bishopsgarth.

Geography 
A green belt divides the suburb from neighbouring Hartburn to the south, while at its western end, Fairfield ends abruptly at the edge of the town.

Administration 
Fairfield is administered as a ward in Stockton Borough Council. In June 2021 a proposition that the ward be split in two saw opposition from local councillors.

Education 
Fairfield has one infant school (Rosehill), one junior school (Holy Trinity, fed by Rosehill), and three primary schools: Fairfield Primary School, St Mark's CE VA Primary School and St. Patrick's Roman Catholic Primary School. It has two secondary schools: Our Lady and St Bede Catholic Academy, and Ian Ramsey Church of England Academy. It is also home to Stockton Sixth Form College. The Grangefield Academy is technically in the Fairfield ward, but the neighbouring Grangefield estate is in the Newtown ward, not Fairfield Fairfield.

Religious Sites 
Fairfield has an Anglican church and a Catholic church. Holy Trinity with St Mark is an Anglican venue on Bedale Grove. When St Mark's Church closed, the two parishes were merged into the site of Holy Trinity Church. St. Patrick's Roman Catholic Church, built in 1973, is located on Glenfield Road, adjacent to the primary school of the same name.

Amenities 
There are three public houses located in the suburb: The Rimswell, The Fairfield, and The Mitre.

Fairfield Library is next to Ian Ramsey CE Academy.

References

External links

 Fairfield Library

Areas of Stockton-on-Tees